The  is a railway line in Nagano Prefecture, Japan, operated by the East Japan Railway Company (JR East). It connects Shinonoi Station in Nagano with Shiojiri Station in Shiojiri.

The line is a corridor between the Shinetsu Main Line and the Chūō Main Line. All the limited express trains on the Shinonoi Line come from the Chūō Main Line: Azusa from Tokyo and Shinano from Nagoya.

Stations 
All stations are located in Nagano Prefecture.

●: All trains stop, ▲: Some trains stop, ｜: non-stop, Rapid Misuzu stops at all stations

Passing loops and switchbacks

Hirase loop
It has two tracks.
 Coordinates:

Haneo switchback
A switchback is located in Azumino, known as 
 Coordinates:

Kuwanohara switchback
A switchback is located in Azumino, known as  
 Coordinates:

Rolling stock

Limited express
E353 series EMU (Azusa, Kaiji)
383 series EMU (Wide View Shinano)

Local
E127 series EMU
211 series EMU
313 series EMU

Former rolling stock
115 series EMU
123 series EMU
381 series EMU (Shinano) 
E257 series EMU (Azusa, Kaiji)
E351 series EMU (Super Azusa)

History

The Shinonoi to Nishijo section opened in 1900, and was extended via Matsumoto to Shiojiri in 1902.

The Shiojiri to Matsumoto section was double-tracked between 1961 and 1965, with the Tazawa to Akashina section double-tracked in 1966. The Akashina to Nishijo section was also double-tracked, but the original line was decommissioned in 1988.

The Shiojiri to Matsumoto section was electrified in 1964/5, and extended to Shinonoi in 1973, CTC signalling being commissioned on the entire line the previous year.

Former connecting lines
 Matsumoto Station: The Chikuma Electric Railway opened a 5 km line, electrified at 600 V DC, to Asama Onsen in 1924. In 1958 the voltage was raised to 750 V DC, but the line closed in 1964.

References

 
Railway lines in Nagano Prefecture
Lines of East Japan Railway Company
1067 mm gauge railways in Japan
Railways with Zig Zags